The following music singles are from the anime series The Melancholy of Haruhi Suzumiya sung by the voice actors for the three main female and two main male characters in the series along with four other supporting female characters, making the total number of character albums nine in all. The first three released included songs by Aya Hirano as Haruhi Suzumiya, Minori Chihara as Yuki Nagato and Yuko Goto as Mikuru Asahina. Moreover, two additional character CDs were released on December 6, 2006, sung by Yuki Matsuoka as Tsuruya and Natsuko Kuwatani as Ryōko Asakura. Two more character CDs were released on January 24, 2007, sung by Sayaka Aoki as Kyon's Sister and Yuri Shiratori as Emiri Kimidori.  Finally, the CDs for Itsuki Koizumi and Kyon were released on February 21, 2007.

Each of the nine singles feature the ending theme song "Hare Hare Yukai". Other than the three main female character's versions which are solo cover versions of the original, there are some alterations. For Tsuruya's version as well as Ryōko's version, the lyrics were changed to fit the character; Tsuruya's version contains her catch phrase "nyoro", while Ryōko reverses the optimistic lyrics to convey futility and destruction. However, while Tsuruya's and Ryōko's versions have the same arrangements as the original version, the last four released have their arrangements changed along with the lyrics. Kyon's Sister's version is very upbeat; Emiri's version is very fact-based; Itsuki's version talks about his ESP; and Kyon reflects about his now-disturbed life in his version.

First set

Haruhi Suzumiya

 is the first volume of the character song albums and was released on July 5, 2006. The special edition of the third volume DVD of the anime series in North America bundled this CD in the package, released on September 25, 2007.

 Oricon Weekly Rank Peak: #11
 Weeks in Chart: 10 weeks

Track listing
 – 4:19
 – 3:46
 – 3:37
 – 4:19
 – 3:46
 – 3:37

Yuki Nagato

 is the second volume of the character song albums and was released on July 5, 2006.

 Oricon Weekly Rank Peak: #13
 Weeks in Chart: 16 weeks (Longest charting single of the series)

Track listing
 – 4:30
"SELECT?" – 4:21
 – 3:37
 – 4:30
"SELECT? (off vocal)" – 4:21
 – 3:37

Mikuru Asahina

 is the third volume of the character song albums and was released on July 5, 2006.

 Oricon Weekly Rank Peak: #14
 Weeks in Chart: 8 weeks

Track listing
 – 3:57
 – 4:22
 – 3:37 
 – 3:57
 – 4:22
 – 3:37

Tsuruya-san

 is the fourth volume of the character song albums and was released on December 6, 2006.

 Oricon Weekly Rank Peak: #13
 Weeks in Chart: 9 weeks

Track listing
 – 4:09
 – 5:14
 – 3:37
 – 4:09
 – 5:14

Ryōko Asakura

 is the fifth volume of the character song albums and was released on December 6, 2006.

 Oricon Weekly Rank Peak: #16
 Weeks in Chart: 9 weeks

Track listing
 – 4:39
"COOL EDITION" – 3:48
 – 3:37
 – 4:39
"COOL EDITION" (off vocal) – 3:48

Kyon's Sister

 is the sixth volume of the character song albums and was released on January 24, 2007. This single is the second highest charting of all the Haruhi Character singles, however, also was the second shortest in charting weeks.

 Oricon Weekly Rank Peak: #10
 Weeks in Chart: 6 weeks

Track listing
 – 3:37
 – 3:42
 – 3:37
 – 3:42

Emiri Kimidori

 is the seventh volume of the character song albums and was released on January 24, 2007.

 Oricon Weekly Rank Peak: #11
 Weeks in Chart: 5 weeks (Shortest charting single out of the whole series)

Track listing
"Fixed Mind" – 5:04
 – 4:50
"Fixed Mind" (off vocal) – 5:04
 – 4:50

Itsuki Koizumi

 is the eighth volume of the character song albums and was released on February 21, 2007.

 Oricon Weekly Rank Peak: #11
 Weeks in Chart: 10 weeks

Track listing
 – 3:51
 – 5:08
 – 3:51
 – 5:08

Kyon

 is the ninth volume of the character song albums and was released on February 21, 2007. Kyon's single was the highest charting of all the series, and the second longest charting.

 Oricon Weekly Rank Peak: #9
 Weeks in Chart: 12 weeks

Track listing
 – 3:36
 – 5:10
 – 3:36
 – 5:10

Second set

Haruhi Suzumiya

 is the first volume of the character song albums and was released on October 1, 2009.

Track listing
"Punkish Regular" – 3:24
 – 4:03
"Punkish Regular (off vocal)" – 3:24
 – 3:46

Yuki Nagato

 is the second volume of the character song albums and was released on October 1, 2009.

Track listing
"under 'Mebius'" – 5:11 
 – 3:51
"under 'Mebius' (off vocal)" – 5:11
 – 3:51

Mikuru Asahina

 is the third volume of the character song albums and was released on October 1, 2009.

Track listing
 – 3:53
 – 3:48
 – 3:53
 – 3:48

Itsuki Koizumi

 is the fourth volume of the character song albums and was released on November 18, 2009.

Track list
 – 4:25
 – 4:40
 – 4:25
 – 4:40

Kyon

 is the fifth volume of the character song albums and was released on December 9, 2009.

Track list
 – 4:21
 – 3:48
 – 4:21
 – 3:48

Tsuruya-san

 is the sixth volume of the character song albums and was released on December 9, 2009.

Track list
 – 3:16
 – 3:38
 – 3:16
 – 3:38

Taniguchi

 is the seventh volume of the character song albums and was released on December 9, 2009.

Track list
 – 3:30
 – 3:47
 – 3:30
 – 3:47

References

Anime soundtracks
Film and television discographies
Albums
Discographies of Japanese artists
Lists of songs
Character songs